Major-General Thomas Pelham-Clinton, 3rd Duke of Newcastle-under-Lyne (1 July 1752 – 18 May 1795), known as Lord Thomas Pelham-Clinton until 1779 and as Earl of Lincoln from 1779 to 1794, was a British Army officer and politician who sat in the House of Commons between 1774 and 1794 when he succeeded to the peerage as Duke of Newcastle.

Born on 1 July and christened on 28 July 1752 at St Margaret's, Westminster, Pelham-Clinton was the second but eldest surviving son of Henry Pelham-Clinton, 2nd Duke of Newcastle-under-Lyne, and his wife Lady Catherine Pelham, daughter of Henry Pelham. After his education, he embarked on a military career. In April 1774, he accompanied General Henry Lloyd, General Henry Clinton and Major Thomas Carleton as "English observers" of the Second Russo-Turkish War on the Danube (Speelman, 2002). He served in America during the American War of Independence as Aide-de-Camp to his relative, General Sir Henry Clinton, and was later Aide-de-Camp to the King. He achieved the rank of Major-General in 1787.

Pelham-Clinton also sat as Member of Parliament for Westminster from 1774 to 1780 and for East Retford from 1781 to 1794 and was Lord Lieutenant of Nottinghamshire from 1794 to 1795. In February 1794 he succeeded his father in the dukedom.

Pelham-Clinton married Lady Anna Maria Stanhope, daughter of William Stanhope, 2nd Earl of Harrington, in May 1782. They had two sons and two daughters. He died, at his country seat at Sunninghill in Berkshire, in May 1795, aged 42, from the effects of an emetic which he had taken for whooping cough, having held the dukedom for only a year. He was succeeded by his eldest son Henry. The Duchess of Newcastle-under-Lyne later married General Sir Charles Gregan Craufurd and died in 1834.

References

Bibliography

External links
Biography of the 3rd Duke, with links to online catalogues, from Manuscripts and Special Collections at The University of Nottingham

1752 births
1795 deaths
18th-century English nobility
People from Sunninghill
17th Lancers officers
British Army generals
British Army personnel of the American Revolutionary War
003
Thomas
Lord-Lieutenants of Nottinghamshire
Thomas
Members of the Parliament of Great Britain for English constituencies
British MPs 1774–1780
British MPs 1780–1784